The Nastapoka River is a tributary of East coast of Hudson Bay, flowing in the administrative region of Nord-du-Québec, in Quebec, Canada.

Geography

This watercourse dotted with falls and rapids has its source in the Lacs des Loups Marins (English: Lake of Sea Wolves), one of the few freshwater bodies in the world where seals can be seen.

The Nastapoka River Basin was originally part of the project to create the Lac-Guillaume-Delisle and Lac-à-l'Eau-claire National Park. In its most recent version, the Nastapoka Basin was removed for reasons of potential hydroelectric development.

Toponym 
The falls are a popular destination for visitors to Tursujuq National Park.

The Nastapoka River, between Kuujjuarapik and Inukjuak, also belongs to the land of the Inuit who named it Patirtuuq, that is, [where found] a large amount of bone marrow. The name Nastapoka River appears in the report of an exploration mission carried out in the sector in 1877 by the scientist Robert Bell. For its part, the name Rivière Nastapoka appears on the map of Quebec, leaflet north, published in 1914 by the Department of Lands and Forests. Its course, discontinuous, is approximate. The 1914 edition of the Dictionary of Rivers and Lakes of the Province of Quebec bears, probably by mistake, the Nastakopa form. It was in 1946 that the Quebec Geography Commission accepted the name Rivière Nastapoka. The official Quebec map of 1949 and the editions of 1969 of the Gazetteer and 1978 of the Toponymic Repertoire, among other documents, however, have the Nastapoca form. The Commission de toponymie restored the Nastapoka script in 1986. "

Images

References

External links 
 Commission de toponymie – Québec

See also

Lacs des Loups Marins
Iilliq River, a watercourse
Baie d'Hudson
List of rivers of Quebec

Rivers of Nord-du-Québec
Tributaries of Hudson Bay